The 2022 Men's World Floorball Championships was the 14th World Championships in men's floorball. The tournament was played in Zürich and Winterthur, Switzerland, and took place during 5–13 November, 2022.

Sweden defended their title against Czechia, which took their first silver medal since WFC 2004. Finland earned the bronze after defeating Switzerland.

WFC 2022 qualification 

36 teams registered for the 14th IFF Men's World Floorball Championships.  16 have qualified to reach to the final championship.  Host country, Switzerland, qualified automatically.  Côte d'Ivoire has participated in the European qualifiers for the second time in a row, remaining the only team from Africa to have ever participated in the World Floorball Championship Qualifiers. Malaysia was the lone nation to register in 2020 but failed to do so in 2022.  Philippines registered in 2020, but was not able to participate due to the COVID-19 pandemic, and did so for the first time in 2022. However both China and India ultimately did not compete in the Asia-Oceania qualifiers.

a. City may be changed to Katowice.

Venues

Draw 
The draw took place on 8 June 2022 in Zürich, Switzerland.

Tournament groups 
After the group ballot, 16 teams were divided into 4 groups. In the group stage each team has played each other once, while the second stage of the event included play-offs and placement matches.

The two best teams of group A and B went directly to quarter-final. Teams placed 3rd and 4th in group A and B and the teams placed 1st and 2nd in group C and D made it to the first playoff round (played before the quarter-finals).

Results

Preliminary round

Group A

Group B

Group C

Group D

Knock-out stage

Play-off

Quarterfinals

Semifinals

Bronze medal game

Final

Placement matches

5th place bracket

5th–8th place semi-finals

5th place match

7th place match

9th place bracket

9th–12th place semifinals

9th place match

11th place match

13th place bracket

13th–16 place semifinals

13th place bracket

15th place bracket

Ranking and statistics

Final ranking
The official IFF final ranking of the tournament:

References

External links 
 Tournament webpage

Floorball World Championships
2022 in floorball
International floorball competitions hosted by Switzerland
World Floorball Championships
World Floorball Championships
21st century in Zürich
Sports competitions in Zürich
Winterthur